Amor Township is a township in Otter Tail County, Minnesota, United States. The population was 558 at the 2020 census.

Amor Township was organized in 1879, and named for the Latin word meaning "love".

Geography

Demographics

As of the census of 2000, there were 558 people, 210 households, and 158 families residing in the township.  The population density was 24.1 people per square mile (9.3/km2).  There were 640 housing units at an average density of 27.6/sq mi (10.7/km2).  The racial makeup of the township was 98.57% White, 0.36% Native American, 0.36% Asian, 0.18% from other races, and 0.54% from two or more races. Hispanic or Latino of any race were 0.36% of the population.

There were 210 households, out of which 25.2% had children under the age of 18 living with them, 71.0% were married couples living together, 2.4% had a female householder with no husband present, and 24.3% were non-families. 22.9% of all households were made up of individuals, and 11.9% had someone living alone who was 65 years of age or older.  The average household size was 2.35 and the average family size was 2.75.

In the township the population was spread out, with 18.8% under the age of 18, 4.8% from 18 to 24, 20.4% from 25 to 44, 30.8% from 45 to 64, and 25.1% who were 65 years of age or older.  The median age was 50 years. For every 100 females, there were 97.2 males.  For every 100 females age 18 and over, there were 100.4 males.

The median income for a household in the township was $38,833, and the median income for a family was $43,472. Males had a median income of $27,159 versus $29,375 for females. The per capita income for the township was $20,480.  About 1.9% of families and 1.7% of the population were below the poverty line, including none of those under age 18 and 5.3% of those age 65 or over.

References

Townships in Otter Tail County, Minnesota
Townships in Minnesota